NGC 4466 is an edge-on spiral galaxy located about 50 million light-years away in the constellation of Virgo. NGC 4466 was discovered by astronomer Bindon Stoney on February 26, 1851. The galaxy is a member of the Virgo Cluster.

See also 
 List of NGC objects (4001–5000)

References

External links
 

Spiral galaxies
Virgo (constellation)
4466
41170
7626
Astronomical objects discovered in 1851
Virgo Cluster